Make Us One is the third studio album by Evan Wickham. He released the album on December 2, 2013. Wickham worked with Peter Kipley, in the production of this album.

Critical reception

Awarding the album five stars from Worship Leader, Andrea Hunter describes, "Evan Wickham's Make Us One is among the most expansive and cinematic modern worship albums since Gungor's Ghosts Upon the Earth." Jonathan Andre, giving the album four stars for Indie Vision Music, states, "Make Us One is a worship album to remember, right up there with Worth It All (Meredith Andrews), The Ascension (Phil Wickham) and Hope Will Rise (Warr Acres) as some of my favourite worship albums of 2013 (pity I didn’t hear the album when I made my top 20 albums list, otherwise Evan Wickham would be there for sure!)."

Track listing

References

2013 albums
Evan Wickham albums